Route 280, or Highway 280, may refer to:

Australia
 McIvor Highway

Canada
 Manitoba Provincial Road 280
 New Brunswick Route 280

Japan
 Japan National Route 280

United States
 Interstate 280 (multiple highways)
 U.S. Route 280
 Arizona State Route 280 (former)
 Arkansas Highway 280
 Arkansas Highway 280 Spur
 Florida State Road 280 (former)
 Georgia State Route 280
Kentucky Route 280
 Maryland Route 280 (former)
 Minnesota State Highway 280
 Montana Secondary Highway 280
 New York State Route 280
 North Carolina Highway 280
 Pennsylvania Route 280 (former)
 South Carolina Highway 280
 Tennessee State Route 280
 Texas State Highway 280 (former proposed)
 Texas State Highway Spur 280
 Farm to Market Road 280 (Texas)
 Utah State Route 280